Kahani Saat Pheron Ki is a Hindi-language television series that aired on the national channel of India, DD National. Due to its popularity, the series was also shown on TV Asia and AZN Television channels in United States.

Plot 
The show is based on the lives of two cousins, Deepa and Shefali, who are extremely close to each other, regardless of the strained relationship between their respective fathers. Deepa is bright and sensitive while Shefali is gregarious and ambitious. Both live completely different lives, but face the trials of their loves and the lies together.

Cast 
 Narayani Shastri / Indira Krishnan as Deepa Shekhar Sehgal
 Sheeba Chaddha as Shefali Malhotra
 Aashish Kaul as Shekhar Sehgal
 Khyaati Khandke Keswani as Preeti Sehgal
 Vaishali Thakkar as Savri
 Prabhat Bhattacharya
 Indraneel Bhattacharya as Shefali's Husband
 Rinku Dhawan as Shammi Sehgal, Shekhar's elder sister

DD National original programming
Indian television soap operas
2007 Indian television series debuts